Little Pakistan is a general name for an ethnic enclave populated primarily by Pakistani immigrants and people of Pakistani ancestry (overseas Pakistanis), usually in an urban neighborhood all over the world.

Locations

Australia

 Auburn, Sydney

 Rooty Hill, Sydney

Belgium
 Rue Brogniez - Brussels
 Ixelles - Brussels

Norway

Grønland Street - Oslo - also called "Little Karachi".

Oman

 Muttrah - Muscat

Spain

 El Raval - Barcelona

Saudi Arabia

 Aziziya, Jeddah
 Pakistani Ilaka - Al Khobar
 Haara - Riyadh

United Arab Emirates
 Al Souk Al Kabir - Dubai

United States

 Coney Island Avenue - Brooklyn, New York City, New York ("Little Pakistan", Brooklyn)
 Jackson Heights - Queens, New York City, New York (also known as South Hall of New York)
 Hicksville - Nassau County, Long Island, New York
 Valley Stream - Nassau County, Long Island, New York
 Lexington Avenue - Manhattan, New York City, New York
Oak Tree Road - Edison, New Jersey
”Little Karachi” - Paterson, New Jersey
 Irvine - Orange County, California
 Westwood - Los Angeles, California
Pioneer Boulevard - Artesia, California
Fremont, California - Known for its large community of Pashtuns
 West Trinity Mills Road - Carrollton, Dallas, Texas
 Hillcroft Avenue - Houston, Texas
 HW-6/ Voss Rd Sugar Land, Houston, Texas
 Devon Avenue - Chicago, Illinois

Canada
 Mississauga, Ontario
 Milton, Ontario

United Kingdom

England
Bradford - West Yorkshire
Curry Mile - Manchester
Glodwick - Oldham
Alum Rock - Birmingham 
Sparkbrook - Birmingham 
Sparkhill - Birmingham
Nether Edge - Sheffield
Normanton - Derby
Green Street - London
Ilford - London
Walthamstow - London
Rotherham - South Yorkshire
Luton - Bedfordshire
Slough - Berkshire
High Wycombe - Buckinghamshire
Darnall - Sheffield
Burngreave - Sheffield
Leicester - Leicestershire
Oldham - Greater Manchester
Rochdale - Greater Manchester
Didsbury - Manchester
Keighley - Bradford
Dewsbury - Kirklees
Smethwick - Sandwell
Darlaston - Walsall
Birkenhead - Wirral
Aylesbury - Buckinghamshire
Thornton Lodge - West Yorkshire

Scotland
Pollokshields - Glasgow

Wales
Grangetown - Cardiff

Qatar
In Qatar there isn't a specific “Little Pakistan” but rather a “Little South Asia” where South Asian bachelors and families form the majority 
Matar Qadeem
Najma

References

 

Pakistani diaspora by country
People of Pakistani descent